The 2008 Hart Council election took place on 1 May 2008 to elect members of Hart District Council in Hampshire, England. One third of the council was up for election and the council stayed under no overall control, with the Conservatives as the largest party.

After the election, the composition of the council was:
Conservative 17
Liberal Democrat 10
Community Campaign (Hart) 6
Independent 2

Campaign
12 seats were being contested in the election with the Conservatives defending 6 seats, the Liberal Democrats 5 and the Community Campaign (Hart) 1 seat. In total there were 30 candidates standing in the election with the Conservatives the only party to stand in all of the seats. Other candidates included 10 from the Liberal Democrats, 5 from Labour, 2 Community Campaign (Hart) and 1 from the British National Party. Before the election a coalition of the Liberal Democrats, Community Campaign (Hart) and the 2 Independents ran the council with the Conservatives forming the opposition.

Issues in the election included facilities for teenagers, cleaner streets, recycling and reducing crime. The Conservatives wanted to improve the value for money the council produced, develop the infrastructure for new housing and to keep roads in good condition. However the Liberal Democrats pledged to improve recycling, get more affordable housing and keep crime levels low.

During the campaign the national Conservative leader, David Cameron, visited the area to campaign for the party.

Election result
The results saw the council remain with no party having a majority, but with the Conservatives gaining 2 seats to hold 17 of the 35 seats. Both Conservative gains came from the Liberal Democrats, taking Fleet Courtmoor by 391 votes and Fleet Pondtail by 493 votes. The Conservatives won 60% of the vote and claimed a mandate to take control of the council. However the 2 independents held the balance of power between the Conservatives and the Liberal Democrat/Community Campaign (Hart) alliance. Overall turnout in the election was 36.9%.

At the annual council meeting after the election the Conservatives took control of the council. Their leader Ken Crookes won 18 votes compared to 17 for Liberal Democrat leader David Neighbour, with 1 of the 2 independents, Susan Band, backing the Conservatives. The other independent, Denis Gotel, and the Community Campaign (Hart) backed the Liberal Democrat leader. As a result, the council cabinet was made up of all Conservatives, except for independent Susan Band who would continue to be responsible for housing and health.

Ward results

Blackwater and Hawley

Church Crookham East

Crondall

Fleet Central

Fleet Courtmoor

Fleet Pondtail

Fleet West

Hook

Long Sutton

Odiham

Yateley East

Yateley West

References

2008
2008 English local elections
2000s in Hampshire